Vilas Vishnu Sawant is a former Indian politician and a two term member of the Maharashtra Legislative Assembly. Sawant was elected twice from the Naigaon Assembly constituency.

References 

Maharashtra MLAs 1985–1990
Marathi politicians